Franco Imoda, S.J. is an Italian Jesuit priest, who served as Rector of the Pontifical Gregorian University in Rome from 1998 to 2004.

Imoda was born in Turin. Before his appointment as the rector of the Pontifical Gregorian University, he had been a professor in the Institute of Psychology of that university since 1971. He studied philosophy at Vals-près-le-Puy in France, and theology at Chieri, near Turin. Imoda obtained a doctorate in clinical psychology at the University of Chicago, and finished his training at the Illinois State Psychiatric Institute and the Psychosomatic and Psychiatric Institute of the Michael Reese Hospital at Chicago.

References

Human Development Psychology and Mystery, l
Leuven, Peeters 1998

Year of birth missing (living people)
Living people
21st-century Italian Jesuits
Pontifical Gregorian University rectors
Clergy from Turin
University of Chicago alumni
Italian psychologists
People in health professions from Turin